Mrs. Globe is an annual international beauty pageant open to women who are over 25, married, or who are parents. The pageant is heavily involved with charity work. Funds are raised for the charity Woman in Need in the over 70 countries which take part in the pageant. Ksenia Krivko was crowned Mrs. Globe 2020 at the international contest on December 7 in Shenzhen, China.

Mrs. Globe 2022 ran May 31 - June 5, 2022. The winner was Maynus Sorrayutsenee from Thailand.

Titleholders

Countries by number of wins

Other Mrs. Globe Titleholders 

The Mrs. Curve' Globe competition is for plus-sized women and the Mrs. Classique Globe competition is for women over 45 years of age.

Mrs. Classique Globe

Mrs. Curve' Globe

Mrs. Curve' Classique Globe

See also
 List of beauty contests
 Mrs. Universe
 Mrs. World

References 

International beauty pageants